The European qualification for the 2017 World Men's Handball Championship in France was disputed in two rounds among the teams that did not qualify for the 2016 European Men's Handball Championship and the 12 worst-ranked teams from the European Championship (excluding France). The qualification matches took place between November 2015 and June 2016.

In the first round of qualification, 22 teams not participating at the European Championship were split into six groups. The group winners advanced to the second round, joining the 12 European Championship finalists. The 18 teams were then paired into two-legged play-off ties to determine the nine remaining World Championship qualifiers from Europe.

All times are local.

First round
The draw was held on 17 June 2015.

Group 1

Group 2

Group 3

Group 4
The teams agreed to play this group in a mini-tournament format at one venue. The draw decided that Israel earned the right to host that tournament.

Group 5

Group 6

Play-off round
The six teams advancing from the first round and the twelve teams ranked outside the top three at the 2016 European Championship (not including France) competed in the play-off round. The eighteen teams were paired in a total of nine two-legged ties, with the winners qualifying for the World Championship final tournament.

Draw
The play-off round draw was held on 31 January 2016 at 13:30, in Kraków, Poland. The teams were seeded into two pots, with teams from Pot 1 (seeded) being drawn against teams from Pot 2 (unseeded).

Notes

Overview
The first leg were played on 10–12 June 2016 and the second legs on 15–16 June 2016.

|}

Matches

Sweden won 54–46 on aggregate.

Macedonia won 56–55 on aggregate.

Poland won 51–46 on aggregate.

Russia won 58–41 on aggregate.

Hungary won 56–50 on aggregate.

Iceland won 46–44 on aggregate.

Slovenia won 51–47 on aggregate.

52–52 on aggregate. Belarus won on away goals.

Denmark won 58–47 on aggregate.

References

External links
Eurohandball.com 

2015 in handball
2016 in handball
World Handball Championship tournaments
Qualification for handball competitions